Verkada Inc. is a San Mateo, CA-based company that develops cloud-based building security and operating systems. The company combines security equipment such as video cameras, access control systems and environmental sensors, with cloud based machine vision and artificial intelligence.

The company was founded in 2016. In 2021, it was the target of a data breach that accessed security camera footage and private data.

History
Verkada Inc. was founded in 2016 in Menlo Park, California by three Stanford University graduates: Filip Kailiszan, James Ren, and Benjamin Bercowitz, who were joined by Hans Robertson, co-founder and former COO of Meraki (now Cisco Meraki).  Kaliszan, Ren, and Bercowitz had previously collaborated on Courserank, a class data aggregation platform that was acquired by Chegg in 2010. 

Verkada exited the beta development stage in September 2017, with a product offering of two camera models. 

In 2019, Forbes included Verkada in its Next Billion Dollar Startups list, as well as that year’s AI 50 list of most promising artificial intelligence companies. In April, the company announced a $40 million Series B funding round, which valued the company at $540 million.

In January 2020, the company raised $80 million in a Series C funding found led by Felicis Ventures, giving the company a $1.6 billion valuation. In Spring 2020, the company launched its first access control device, the first move in a shift to moving beyond cameras, and integrating security cameras and locks onto a single platform.  In June during the COVID-19 crisis Verkada instituted a program to offer free surveillance kits to businesses and healthcare institutions in order to remotely monitor high-risk locations. It also added features to let customers detect when crowds are forming, and to identify high traffic areas that might need more cleaning.  In September, the company launched a line of integrated environmental sensors. In September, it introduced a line of environmental sensors for facilities monitoring.

In April 2021, news site Bloomberg News reported allegations by former employees accusing the company of having a "bro" culture, with lax device security, excessive focus on profit, and parties during the COVID-19 pandemic. In the Bloomberg reporting, Verkada acknowledged an internal lapse in judgment, and was reportedly working to create a more inclusive work environment, including reviewing gender pay equity and implementing better training. In September, the company began donating security cameras to Asian Pacific American business communities, starting with the Oakland California Chinatown Chamber of Commerce, to address growing anti-Asian threats and violence against its members.

In August 2022, the company announced a mailroom product to help companies keep track of mail packages and shipments coming into their facilities. In September, the company raised $205 million in Series D funding, bringing its valuation to $3.2 billion.

Data breach 
On March 8, 2021, Verkada was hacked by an international group including maia arson crimew and calling themselves the "APT69420 Arson Cats," which gained access to their network for about 36 hours and collected about 5 gigabytes of data. {{Not in citation}}

Initially, it was reported that the scope of the incident included live and recorded security camera footage from more than 150,000 cameras. It was later reported that 95 customers' video and images data were accessed  Crimew told Bloomberg News that the hack "exposes just how broadly we're being surveilled".

In response to the data breach, in April 2021 it was reported that Verkada CEO Filip Kaliszan announced a series of measures, including red team/blue team exercises, a bug bounty program, mandatory two-factor authentication use by Verkada support staff, and the sharing of more audit logs with Verkada customers.

Controversies
In August 2021, Motorola Solutions filed a 52-page complaint against Verkada with the United States International Trade Commission, alleging that Verkada cameras and software infringe upon patents held by Motorola subsidiary Avigilon. Verkada subsequently filed a lawsuit against Motorola Solutions in the California Northern District Court in September 2021, arguing that Motorola has "sought to effectively shut Verkada’s business down." Later in September, the International Trade Commission initiated its investigation into Motorola's complaint, with Verkada stating in its response that it does not infringe upon any of Motorola's patents.

References

External links

Video surveillance companies
Physical security
Companies based in San Mateo, California
Technology companies based in the San Francisco Bay Area
Computer companies of the United States
Computer companies established in 2016
American companies established in 2016
2016 establishments in California